Miss Grand Tanzania was a Tanzanian female national beauty pageant, founded in 2017 by a Dar es Salaam-based legal counsel, Rasheedah Jamaldin. The winner of the contest represented the country in its international parent contest, Miss Grand International. Jamaldin terminated her partnership with Miss Grand International Limited in late 2018 after her both affiliated representatives were unplaced two years in a row. Previously, from 2014 to 2015, the competition license belonged to a businessperson, Veronika Rovegno, but all country representatives during that period were appointed.

Since the debutant in 2014, to date, none of Tanzania's representatives have qualified for the top 20 round on the international stage. However, the 2018 candidate, Queen Mugesi Ainory Gesase, was placed among the top 10 best in a national costume competition, one of the main sub-contests in the Miss Grand International pageant.

History
Tanzania made its debutant at Miss Grand International in 2014 by Lorraine Marriot, under the direction of a businessperson based in Dar es Salaam, Veronika Rovegno.  Later in 2015, Jinah Dameckh, the second runner-up Miss Tanzania 2014, was appointed to represent the country at the 2015 international edition but she withdrew for undisclosed reasons. 

After two consecutive years of absence, Tanzania returned to the competition when a Dar es Salaam-based legal counsel, Rasheedah Jamaldin, purchased the franchise for 2017–2018. The final competition was attended by Miss Grand International 2016, Ariska Putri Pertiwi, and the vice president of the international organization, Teresa Chaivisut.

Initially, the licensee intended to run the pageant from the community to the national level, but in 2018, a Tanzanian representative for Miss Grand International, Queen Mugesi Ainory Gesase, was instead appointed, and the contract between the international and the Tanzanian organizer was no longer extended. Since then, to date, no Tanzanian candidates have additionally participated in the Miss Grand International pageant.

Edition
The following list is the edition detail of the Miss Grand Tanzania contest, which was held individually once in 2017.

Representatives at Miss Grand International

Color keys

References

External links

 

Tanzania
Beauty pageants in Tanzania
Recurring events established in 2017
2016 establishments in Tanzania